Clifton Park, NY, Vol. 1 is the fifth studio album and first part of the Clifton Park, NY double album by Desmadrados Soldados de Ventura, released on 5 July 2015  by Golden Lab Records. Edwin Pouncey of The Wire drew favorable comparisons to the music of Glenn Branca and The Velvet Underground's "Sister Ray", saying "the music here sounds like a celebration of being alive and totally absorbed in the process of creation."

Track listing

Personnel
Adapted from the Clifton Park, NY, Vol. 1 liner notes.

Desmadrados Soldados de Ventura
 David Birchall – electric guitar
 Andrew Cheetham – drums
 Mike Griffin – electric guitar
 Eric Hardiman – electric guitar
 Dylan Hughes – electric guitar
 Nick Mitchell – electric guitar
 Edwin Stevens – electric guitar
 Otto Willberg – bass guitar

Production and additional personnel
 John Moloney – cover art, illustrations

Release history

References

External links 
 Clifton Park, NY, Vol. 1 at Bandcamp

2015 albums
Desmadrados Soldados de Ventura albums
Instrumental albums